The Glitterbug Tour 2015 is a major concert tour by Liverpool alternative band The Wombats, in support of their third studio album Glitterbug, which was released in April 2015. The band played 121 shows in 22 different countries.

Synopsis
The tour started in January 2015 with a set of warm up shows in the UK and USA. The full tour began in March across continental Europe, continuing in the United Kingdom following the release of the album Glitterbug. This was followed by a tour of America in late April and May. The band then appeared in festivals across the world during the summer, including Splendour in the Grass where the band drew the largest crowd of the festival. The band followed this with additional tours of Europe, the United States and Australia, where they headlined the Byron Bay leg of Falls Festival on New Year's Eve. The tour concluded at the Hordern Pavilion in Sydney on 3 January 2016.

Setlists
Notable absentees from the setlist were 2007 hit single "Backfire at the Disco" and "Anti-D", as well as previous regular "Euroscheisse" only making infrequent appearances.

Songs
 "Kill the Director"
 "Moving to New York"
 "Party in a Forest (Where's Laura?)"
 "Let's Dance to Joy Division"
 "Little Miss Pipedream"
 "Patricia the Stripper"
 "Tokyo (Vampires & Wolves)"
 "Jump into the Fog"
 "Techno Fan"
 "1996"
 "Emoticons"
 "Give Me a Try"
 "Greek Tragedy"
 "Be Your Shadow"
 "Headspace"
 "This Is Not a Party"
 "Isabel"
 "Your Body is a Weapon"
 "The English Summer"
 "Pink Lemonade"
 "Curveballs"
 "Euroscheisse"

Personnel
Band:
 Matthew Murphy – vocals, guitar, synths
 Dan Haggis – backing vocals, drums, stylophone, harmonica, melodica, synthesizers
 Tord Øverland Knudsen – backing vocals, bass, synths

Crew:
Simon Fuller - Tour Manager
Pete Bartlett - FOH Engineer
Paul Roberts - Monitor Engineer
Jamie Hicks - Drums/Keys/MIDI Technician
Joel Ashton - Guitar/Bass Technician
Dan Hill - Lighting Designer
Tony Hughes - Merchandise
Fuller's Ma - Vibes

Support acts
Cheerleader
Circa Waves
Compny
Darlia
Kid Astray
Life in Film
POP ETC
Prides
Royal Teeth
Sundara Karma
Team Me
 The Night Café

Tour dates

Festivals and other miscellaneous performances
Part of "[V] Island Party"
Part of "El Festival de les Arts"
Part of "Pinkpop Festival"
Part of "Provinssirock Festival"
Part of "Budapest Essentials Festival"
Part of "Fingers Up Festival"
Part of "NOS Alive"
Part of "T in the Park"
Part of "Dour Festival"
Part of "Deichbrand Festival"
Part of "Splendour in the Grass"
Part of "Lollapalooza"
Part of "Ahmad Tea Music Festival"
Part of "Summer Well Festival"
Part of "Antidote Festival"
Part of "Highfield Festival"
Part of "FM4 Frequency Festival"
Part of "Reading and Leeds Festival"
Part of "Falls Festival"

References

2015 concert tours